Matt Stefanishion (born October 5, 1983) was a Canadian professional ice hockey right wing.  He was not selected in the NHL Entry Draft; however, he was signed to a two-year contract by the Washington Capitals on April 1, 2006. He also used to play for the Stony Plain Eagles of the Senior AAA Allan Cup Hockey West.

Stefanishion was born in Daysland, Alberta, Canada. After playing two seasons in the Saskatchewan Junior Hockey League with the Melville Millionaires, Stefanishion entered Ferris State University.  He played two seasons with the Bulldogs, being named as an honourable mention to the CCHA All-Rookie Team in the 2004–05 season.  Stefanishion has had a journeyman career throughout the ECHL and to a lesser extent the American Hockey League, suiting up for six separate ECHL teams as well as the Hershey Bears, Hartford Wolf Pack, and Peoria Rivermen of the AHL.  Stefanishion’s last season playing for either an ECHL or AHL team was 2010–11, which he spent with the Victoria Salmon Kings.

References

External links

1983 births
Canadian ice hockey right wingers
Ferris State Bulldogs men's ice hockey players
Fresno Falcons players
Hershey Bears players
Ice hockey people from Alberta
Living people
Reading Royals players
South Carolina Stingrays players